Subiman Ghose (1906 – 21 October 1969) was an Indian politician, belonging to the All India Forward Bloc.

Personal life
Ghosh was the son of Nagendra Nath Ghose, and was married to Protiva Rani Ghose. He obtained Bachelor of Arts and Bachelor of Law degrees. He had five children (three sons and two daughters). Ghose lived in Telo village, at Khandroghosh, Burdwan District of West Bengal.

Parliamentarian
Ghose emerged as a popular local leader of his party in Burdwan District. He was also a leading member of the Bar of Burdwan.

He contested one of the Burdwan seats in the 1952 Indian general election on a Forward Bloc (Marxist) ticket. He obtained 90,242 votes.

Ghosh contested the 1952 by-election from the Goghat seat in the West Bengal Legislative Assembly on a Forward Bloc (Marxist) ticket. He finished in third place with 355 votes (2% of the votes).

He was elected to the Lok Sabha (lower house of the parliament of India) from the Burdwan constituency in the 1957 Indian general election, contesting on a Forward Bloc (Marxist) ticket. Ghose narrowly won the seat, defeating the Indian National Congress candidate by a margin of 2,050 votes.

Ghose lost the Burdwan seat in the 1962 Indian general election, again facing an Indian National Congress candidate in a straight contest. Ghose obtained 123,015 votes (44.17%). The result was challenged in court.

He tried to regain the Burdwan seat in the 1967 Indian general election. Ghose finished in third place after a United Left Front-supported candidate and the Indian National Congress candidate. Ghose obtained 28,950 votes (10.38%).

Late in life, Ghose joined the Praja Socialist Party. Ghose died in Burdwan on 21 October 1969.

References

1906 births
1969 deaths
India MPs 1957–1962
All India Forward Bloc politicians
Lok Sabha members from West Bengal